The Leader of the Government in the Legislative Council, known before 1 July 1966 as Representative of the Government in the Legislative Council, is an office held in New South Wales by the most senior minister in the New South Wales Legislative Council, elected to lead the governing party (or parties) in the council. Though the leader in the Council does not have the power of the office of Premier, there are some parallels between the latter's status in the Legislative Assembly and the former's in the Council. This means that the leader has responsibility for all policy areas, acts as the government's principal spokesperson in the upper house and has priority in gaining recognition from the President of the Council to speak in debate.

Traditionally, but not always, the office has been held with the sinecure office of Vice-President of the Executive Council. The current leader is Don Harwin, since 3 July 2020. The leader is assisted by a Deputy Leader of the Government in the Legislative Council, currently vacant.

List of leaders

Leaders

Deputy Leaders

References

Legislative Council Leader
New South Wales Legislative Council